Saurabh Sunil Tiwary (born 30 December 1989) is an Indian cricketer who plays as a left-handed middle order batsman. He was one of the key batsmen in the Indian team that won the 2008 Under-19 World Cup in Malaysia.

Indian Premier League
He represented Mumbai Indians from the 2008 Indian Premier League. He had become a regular player for them in the IPL 2010, where he was dubbed as a left-handed version of Mahendra Singh Dhoni. It is often believed that he was selected to play for the national team only because he looked like an overweight version Dhoni, although with underweight talent.

He has won the Under-23 player of the tournament for IPL 2010 representing Mumbai Indians as he had a fairly successful tournament, scoring 419 runs in 16 matches, at an average of 29.92 and strike rate of 135.59. He was signed by Royal Challengers Bangalore for the 2011 Indian Premier League at a price of US$1.6 million. In 2014 IPL auction, he was signed by Delhi Daredevils for 70 lakhs Indian rupees. After Tiwary was sidelined by an injured shoulder, he was replaced by Imran Tahir. In the 2016 IPL, Tiwary and Albie Morkel were traded by the Delhi Daredevils to the new franchise Rising Pune Supergiants. In 2016 IPL he scored two promising half centuries against Royal Challengers Bangalore and Mumbai Indians.

In February 2017, he was bought by the Mumbai Indians team for the 2017 Indian Premier League for 30 lakhs. He scored a half century playing against Kolkata Knight Riders at Eden Gardens on 13 May 2017. In January 2018, he was bought by the Mumbai Indians in the 2018 IPL auction. In the 2020 IPL auction, he was bought by the Mumbai Indians ahead of the 2020 Indian Premier League.

International career
Tiwary was called into the squad for the 2010 Asia Cup, but did not play. He made his ODI debut against Australia in Visakhapatnam in October 2010 after a few first-choice players were rested.

References

External links

India One Day International cricketers
Mumbai Indians cricketers
Jharkhand cricketers
1989 births
Living people
People from Ramgarh district
Indian cricketers
Royal Challengers Bangalore cricketers
East Zone cricketers
India Red cricketers
India Blue cricketers
India Green cricketers
Rising Pune Supergiant cricketers
Cricketers from Bihar